Raj Bhavan (translation: Government House), formerly Barnes' Court is the official residence of the Governor of Himachal Pradesh. It is located in the capital city of Shimla, Himachal Pradesh.

History 
The present-day Raj Bhavan was earlier known as the Barnes' Court. When Himachal became a full-fledged state in 1971, the Peterhoff served as the Raj Bhavan. After the building was damaged in a fire, the Raj Bhavan was shifted to the Barnes Court building.

Originally named after Edward Barnes, the commander-in-chief of British India, it is a neo-Tudor timber-framed building.

See also
  Government Houses of the British Indian Empire

References

Governors' houses in India
Buildings and structures in Shimla
1981 establishments in Himachal Pradesh

British-era buildings in Himachal Pradesh